Propynyl (4-propynyloxy-3,5-dimethoxyphenethylamine) is a lesser-known psychedelic drug.  It is closely related in structure to mescaline. Propynyl was first synthesized by Alexander Shulgin. In his book PiHKAL, the minimum dosage is listed as 80 mg, and the duration listed as 8–12 hours. Propynyl produces a body load and few to no mental effects. Very little data exists about the pharmacological properties, metabolism, and toxicity of propynyl.

See also 

 Phenethylamine
 Psychedelics, dissociatives and deliriants

References 

Psychedelic phenethylamines